Silver Town or Silvertown may refer to:

Silvertown, London
Silver Town, a district of Khayelitsha, Cape Town
Silver Town, a district of Rainbow City, Panama
Silver Town (album), by The Men They Couldn't Hang